Jerrod Frank Calhoun (born October 17, 1981) is an American college basketball coach who is currently the head coach for the Youngstown State Penguins men's basketball team.

Playing career
A standout basketball player at Villa Angela-St. Joseph High School in Cleveland, Ohio, Calhoun attended Cleveland State University and played two seasons under Rollie Massimino. He moved on to Cincinnati and acted as a student assistant under Bob Huggins until his graduation in 2004.

Coaching career
Calhoun's first job post graduation was as an assistant at Walsh University where he was part of the Cavaliers' NAIA national championship squad in 2005. In 2007, Calhoun rejoined Huggins at West Virginia as director of basketball operations, while being elevated to assistant coach for one season.

In 2012, Calhoun was hired as the head coach of Division II Fairmont State University, and in six seasons at the helm, he guided the Falcons to a 124–38 record, which included four NCAA Division II Tournament appearances, and culminated in the school's first-ever title game appearance in 2017.

Calhoun was named the 13th coach in Youngstown State history on March 27, 2017, replacing Jerry Slocum.

Head coaching record

References

1981 births
Living people
American men's basketball players
Basketball coaches from Ohio
Cleveland State Vikings men's basketball players
Fairmont State Fighting Falcons men's basketball coaches
Sportspeople from Cleveland
Walsh Cavaliers men's basketball coaches
West Virginia Mountaineers men's basketball coaches
Youngstown State Penguins men's basketball coaches
Basketball players from Cleveland